Kevin Reilly (born 22 February 1986) is an Irish Gaelic footballer. He played at senior level for the Meath county team from 2009 to 2015.

Reilly played in a variety of positions for Meath, appearing in midfield and half-forward in the 2009 All-Ireland Senior Football Championship semi-Final defeat to Kerry. His most frequent position was at full-back, where he played during the 2010 Leinster Senior Football Championship Final, which resulted in a controversial victory over Louth. In 2011, Reilly was part of the Ireland team that won the 2011 International Rules Series against Australia by 130 to 65. In 2013, he was appointed Meath captain by Mick O'Dowd. With his club Navan O'Mahony's, he has won three Meath senior titles. Reilly announced his retirement from inter-county football in 2015 due to injury at just 29.

In December 2019, he was named as a Meath under-20 county team selector under the management of Ger Robinson.

References

1986 births
Living people
Gaelic football backs
Gaelic football selectors
Irish international rules football players
Meath inter-county Gaelic footballers
Navan O'Mahoneys Gaelic footballers